Lyces banana is a moth of the family Notodontidae first described by William Warren in 1901. It is known from only seven specimens collected in Brazil more than 100 years ago.

External links
Species page at Tree of Life Web Project

Notodontidae
Moths described in 1901